The Fundy Islands, also known as the Fundy Isles, is a term given to a group of Canadian islands in the Bay of Fundy along the southwestern coast of New Brunswick, Canada, in the provincial county of Charlotte.

There are over 25 islands within this group including several parishes including the West Isles. Some of the larger islands are inhabited year-round while some of the smaller islands may have seasonal residents. The largest of the islands is Grand Manan with the second and third largest islands being Campobello Island and Deer Island respectively. Deer Island shares its coastline with not only the Bay of Fundy, but also Passamaquoddy Bay to its north. Smaller island exist along each of the larger islands as well as within Passamaquoddy Bay and along the New Brunswick mainland. Some of these islands include White Head Island (situated off Grand Manan's southeast coast), Macs Island and Pendelton Island (both situated between Deer Island and the New Brunswick mainland), Minister's Island and Hospital Island (situated in Passamaquoody Bay).

References 
 Visit Campobello
 Lonely Planet - The Fundy Isles

Landforms of Charlotte County, New Brunswick
Geographic regions of New Brunswick
Coastal islands of New Brunswick